Tibenham may refer to:
Tibenham, Norfolk, a village
RAF Tibenham, a Second World War airfield
, a Ham class minesweeper